Sabburah  is a Syrian nahiyah (subdistrict) located in Salamiyah District in Hama.  According to the Syria Central Bureau of Statistics (CBS), Sabburah Subdistrict had a population of 21900 in the 2004 census.

References 

Sabburah
Salamiyah District